The Josias River is a  river in southern Maine in the United States.  The river enters the Gulf of Maine in the town of Ogunquit where it and the Ogunquit River come together at Perkin's Cove, a popular artist and tourist area.

Research into the name of the river has revealed that, like many geographical features, it has gone by various names over time.  At one time, for example, it was known as Four Mile Brook.  The ultimate name arose from the Littlefield family, the first recorded settlers in Wells, which once included Ogunquit.  Josiah Littlefield owned considerable property along the river, and he built and operated a saw mill at the falls on the river for several years.  This naturally resulted in local residents referring to it as "Josiah's river".

Josiah Littlefield was abducted to Canada in 1708 during the French and Indian Wars, where he spent two years seeking his freedom (freedom was usually bought), only to be killed in an Indian attack in 1712, a couple years after his return.  The river was named in his memory.

See also
List of rivers of Maine

References

Maine Streamflow Data from the USGS
Maine Watershed Data From Environmental Protection Agency

Ogunquit, Maine
Rivers of York County, Maine